Wardite is a hydrous sodium aluminium phosphate hydroxide mineral with formula: NaAl3(PO4)2(OH)4·2(H2O). Wardite is of interest for its rare crystallography.  It crystallizes in the tetragonal trapezohedral class and is one of only a few minerals in that class. Wardite forms vitreous green to bluish green to white to colorless crystals, masses, and fibrous encrustations. It has a Mohs hardness of 5 and a specific gravity of 2.81–2.87.

Occurrence
It occurs with variscite in phosphate nodules and occurs uncommonly in pegmatites and phosphate deposits through alteration of amblygonite.

Wardite was named for Henry Augustus Ward (1834–1906) of the University of Rochester in New York. It first described in 1896 for an occurrence in Clay Canyon, Fairfield, Utah County, Utah, US. Though  rare  it has been reported from many locations worldwide.

See also
List of minerals
List of minerals named after people

References

Mineral galleries

Sodium minerals
Aluminium minerals
Phosphate minerals
Tetragonal minerals
Minerals in space group 92